Philinidae is a family of medium-sized sea slugs, marine opisthobranch gastropod mollusks. These are headshield slugs, in the order Cephalaspidea.

Genera
Genera  within the family Philinidae include:
Subfamily Hermaniinae Chaban, Ekimova, Schepetov, Kohnert, Schrödl & Chernyshev, 2019
 Hermania Monterosato, 1884
 Spiniphiline Gosliner, 1988
Subfamily Philininae Gray, 1850 (1815)
 Globophiline Habe, 1958
 Philine Ascanius, 1772 - type genus
 Spiraphiline Moles, Avila & Malaquias, 2019
 Yokoyamaia Habe, 1950
Genera brought into synonymy
 Bullaea Lamarck, 1801: synonym of Philine Ascanius, 1772
 Choshiphiline Habe, 1958: synonym of Philine Ascanius, 1772
 Johania Monterosato, 1884: synonym of Philine Ascanius, 1772
 Lobaria O.F. Müller, 1776: synonym of Philine Ascanius, 1772
 Ossiania Monterosato, 1884: synonym of Philine Ascanius, 1772
 Philingwynia F. Nordsieck, 1972: synonym of Philine Ascanius, 1772
 Retusophiline Nordsieck, 1972: synonym of Philine Ascanius, 1772
 Woodbridgea S. S. Berry, 1953: synonym of Philine Ascanius, 1772 (doubtful synonym)

References

External links
 Gray, J. E. (1850). [text. In: Gray, M. E., Figures of molluscous animals, selected from various authors. Longman, Brown, Green and Longmans, London. Vol. 4, iv + 219 pp. (August) ]
 Oskars T.R., Bouchet P. & Malaquias M.A. (2015). A new phylogeny of the Cephalaspidea (Gastropoda: Heterobranchia) based on expanded taxon sampling and gene markers. Molecular Phylogenetics and Evolution. 89: 130-150
 Powell A. W. B., New Zealand Mollusca, William Collins Publishers Ltd, Auckland, New Zealand 1979 
 DiscoverLife

 
Taxa named by John Edward Gray